A Fairly Odd Movie: Grow Up, Timmy Turner! (or simply known as A Fairly Odd Movie) is a 2011 live-action/animated comedy television film based on the animated series The Fairly OddParents. It first aired on Nickelodeon in the United States on July 9, 2011, to celebrate the series's tenth anniversary. Unlike the previous animated films of the series, this film is live-action with CGI animation. The television film was viewed by 5.8 million viewers during its original airing.

The television film is set in the city of Dimmsdale and centers on Timmy Turner, his fairy godparents Cosmo and Wanda, and his fairy godbrother Poof. The events of the film take place at the end of the series. Timmy is now 23 years old but is still in fifth grade, with his fairy-obsessed teacher, Mr. Crocker. Timmy finds a loophole in the fairy rulebook: if he continues to act like a child, he will get to keep his fairies. A dilemma arises when Tootie, who was an awkward girl when she was 8 years old, returns to Dimmsdale as an attractive woman. Timmy falls in love with her, a sign that he is becoming an adult, which means that he is closer to losing his fairies. Meanwhile, an oil tycoon, named Hugh J. Magnate, Jr., teams up with Mr. Crocker and plans to use Timmy's fairies' magic to promote his oil business.

The television film was released on Region 1 DVD by Nickelodeon Studios on July 11, 2011. The television film was released on Blu-ray on December 4, 2015.

On March 14, 2012, Nickelodeon announced a sequel to the film, A Fairly Odd Christmas, which premiered during 2012's holiday season, while a third film, A Fairly Odd Summer, premiered on August 2, 2014. Drake Bell, Daniella Monet, and other cast members reprised their roles in both.

Plot 
Thirteen years after the original series, Timmy Turner (Drake Bell) has grown into a 23-year-old adult, but maintains a lifestyle of a 10-year-old to keep his fairy godparents, Cosmo and Wanda, and his godbrother, Poof. Timmy's refusal to mature greatly irritates his parents (who desperately encourage him to move out) and Jorgen von Strangle (Mark Gibbon), who is constantly scheming to entice Timmy into giving up his fairies.

One day, Timmy reunites with a girl from his childhood named Tootie (Daniella Monet), who had an obsessive crush on him for years. She has grown into a beautiful activist and Timmy falls for her instantly. Cosmo and Wanda scheme to repel Tootie, afraid that he is finally growing up and may no longer need them. Timmy is torn between his love for Tootie and his desire to keep his fairies.

Meanwhile, Timmy's schoolteacher, Denzel Crocker, teams up with an oil tycoon by the name of Hugh Magnate in order to kidnap Timmy's fairies and use their magic for their own purposes. Magnate deceives and kidnaps Tootie while Crocker captures Cosmo, Wanda and Poof, imprisoning them in a device programmed to use their magic to grant anybody's wishes. However, Magnate betrays Crocker, wishes he falls into a bottomless ballpit, and tortures the fairies by adjusting the wish-granting machine to electrocute them each time a wish is made. Timmy comes to the rescue of both the fairies and Tootie and battles with both his enemy and a toy robot that Magnate brought to life with the fairies' magic. Timmy successfully frees everyone but is forced to give up his fairies, who vanish the moment he kisses Tootie.

Although Timmy is saddened deeply by the departure of Cosmo, Wanda, and Poof, he is happy to be free to finally pursue more mature endeavors, as he had longed to do. However, he learns from Jorgen that because of his courage, a new law was passed in Fairy World that will now permit him to keep his fairy godparents as long as he makes unselfish wishes. Tootie and Timmy then plan to start a charity organization in which they will make wishes that will mend all of the world's problems or travesties, flying away in a magical van, which turns around and flies towards the camera (in a direct parody of Back to the Future). Magnate is sent to a mental hospital after claiming that fairies exist, and his secretary becomes CEO of the company, turning it into an environmentally-friendly enterprise. The film ends with Crocker finally falling out of the ball pit, landing in front of the Turners' house, and walking away, foreshadowing his return in A Fairly Odd Christmas.

Cast

 Drake Bell as Timmy Turner
 Daniella Monet as Tootie
 Steven Weber as Hugh J. Magnate, Jr.
 Jason Alexander as Live Action Cosmo
 Cheryl Hines as Live Action Wanda
 Daran Norris as Animated Cosmo  and Mr. Turner
 Susanne Blakeslee as Animated Wanda 
 Tara Strong as Poof 
 Randy Jackson as Poof 
 Teryl Rothery as Mrs. Turner
 Mark Gibbon as Jorgen Von Strangle
 David Lewis as Denzel Crocker
 Jesse Reid as A.J.
 Chris Anderson as Chester McBadbat
 Devon Weigel as Vicky
 Christie Laing as Janice
 Olivia Steele-Falconer as Katie
 Darien Provost as Howie
 Qayam Devji as Ravi
 Diego Martinez as Mouse
 Butch Hartman as Maitre D'
 Serge Houde as the Mayor of Dimmsdale
 Harrison Houde as Hall Monitor
 Nicola Anderson as Real Estate Agent
 Keith Blackman Dallas as Bulldozer Operator
 Lee Tichon as Magnate Goon #1
 Osmond L. Bramble as Magnate Goon #2
 Judith Maxie as Fairy Council Member #1
 John Innes as Fairy Council Member #2
 Raugi Yu as Asian Waiter

Ratings
The film attracted 5.8 million viewers on its premiere night. It was also the top-rated broadcast on cable networks for the week ending on July 10, 2011. The film's ratings were the highest for The Fairly OddParents films since its preceding special, Wishology, a trilogy film which attained 4.0 million, 3.6 million, and 4.1 million viewers for its three parts, "The Big Beginning", "The Exciting Middle Part", and "The Final Ending", respectively, during its premiere broadcast on May 1–3, 2009.

Sequels
Twenty days after the film's premiere on Nickelodeon, The Fairly OddParents creator and film writer Butch Hartman tweeted that he was working on ideas for a sequel to Grow Up, Timmy Turner! On March 14, 2012, during Nickelodeon's 2012-2013 Upfront, a sequel to 2011's first live-action TV film was announced. The sequel, titled A Fairly Odd Christmas, aired on November 29, 2012, and, in 2013, it was announced that there would be a third and final installment, titled A Fairly Odd Summer, which aired on August 2, 2014; Drake Bell and Daniella Monet reprised their roles in both.

References

External links

 
 Official FOP Movie website at Nick.com

American comedy films
American coming-of-age films
American fantasy comedy films
Canadian fantasy comedy films
English-language Canadian films
The Fairly OddParents films
Films about wish fulfillment
Films directed by Savage Steve Holland
Films scored by Guy Moon
Films shot in Vancouver
American films with live action and animation
Live-action films based on animated series
Nickelodeon original films
Trying to prevent adulthood in popular culture
2011 films
2010s English-language films
2010s American films
2010s Canadian films